Atelidea spinosa is a species of spider in the long-jawed orb weaver family Tetragnathidae, found in Sri Lanka.

References

Tetragnathidae
Spiders of the Indian subcontinent
Spiders described in 1895